Heavy metal detox, or detoxification, is the removal of metallic toxic substances from the body.     In conventional medicine, detoxification can also be achieved artificially by techniques such as dialysis and (in a very limited number of cases) chelation therapy. There is a firm scientific base in evidence-based medicine for this type of detoxification . Many alternative medicine practitioners promote various other types of detoxification such as "diet detoxification" .

The detox is performed to rid the body of toxic metals.

Toxic metals, including heavy metals, are individual metals and metal compounds that negatively affect people's health. Some toxic, semi-metallic elements, including arsenic and selenium, are discussed in this page. In very small amounts, many of these metals are necessary to support life. However, in larger amounts, they become toxic. They may build up in biological systems and become a significant health hazard. This page provides a starting point for technical and regulatory information about toxic metals.

Arsenic

Common sources of exposure to higher-than-average levels of arsenic include hazardous waste sites and surrounding areas, and areas with high levels of arsenic naturally occurring in soil, rocks, and water. Exposure to high levels of arsenic can cause death.

Beryllium
Elemental beryllium has a wide variety of applications. Occupational exposure most often occurs in mining, extraction, and in the processing of alloy metals containing beryllium. Beryllium causes lung and skin disease in 2 to 10 percent of exposed workers.

Cadmium
Cadmium is an extremely toxic metal commonly found in industrial workplaces, particularly where any ore is being processed or smelted. Several deaths from acute exposure have occurred among welders who have unsuspectingly welded on cadmium-containing alloys or with silver solders.

Hexavalent chromium
Forms of hexavalent chromium can be toxic. Calcium chromate, chromium trioxide, lead chromate, strontium chromate, and zinc chromate are known human carcinogens. An increase in the incidence of lung cancer has been observed among workers in industries that produce chromate and manufacture pigments containing chromate.

Lead
Occupational exposure to lead is one of the most prevalent overexposures. Industries with high potential exposures include construction work, most smelter operations, radiator-repair shops, and firing ranges.

Mercury
Common sources of mercury exposure include mining, production, and transportation of mercury, as well as mining and refining of gold and silver ores. Other more common sources can be found in silver dental fillings, fluorescent bulbs. High mercury exposure results in permanent nervous system and kidney damage.

References

Detoxification